The Nyah Kur (known in Thai as , Chao Bon) are an ethnic group native to Thailand in Southeast Asia. Closely related to the Mon people, the Nyah Kur are the descendants of the Mon of Dvaravati who did not flee westward or assimilate when their empire fell under the influence of the Khmer when Suryavarman I gained the throne in the early 11th century.

History
The Mon were believed to be one of the earliest people of continental Southeast Asia where they founded some of the earliest recorded civilizations in the region including the Dvaravati in Central Thailand, Sri Gotapura in Central Laos, Hariphunchai in Northern Thailand and the Thaton Kingdom. Dvaravati was among the first to receive Theravada missionaries from Sri Lanka in contrast to Hindu contemporaries, the Khmers and Chams. The Mon adapted the Pallava script to their language and the oldest Mon script was found in a cave in modern Saraburi dating around 550 AD. At the turn of the first millennium, the Mon came under constant pressure due to the Tai migrations from the north and Khmer invasions from the east. When Suryavarman I, the Khmer heir to the throne of the Lavo Kingdom, also became ruler of the Khmer Empire, the vast majority of the Mon of Dvaravati fled west to other Mon lands, were taken as slaves or assimilated to the new culture.

However a small remnant remained in the remote jungles of the Khorat Plateau. Little is known of their history. When they were discovered by western scholars in the early 20th century, it was variously assumed that they were part of the Lawa or Kuy ethnic groups. It was not until 1970 that their language was determined to be directly descended from Old Mon, and in fact, more similar to Old Mon than the modern Mon of their brethren in present-day Burma and Western Thailand. Although Nyah Kur and modern Mon are not mutually intelligible and the endonym Mon is unknown to the Nyah Kur, having remained isolated in the mountains between Central and Northeastern Thailand allowed the Nyah Kur to maintain their own ethnic identity which developed independently from the Mon during the last thousand years yet in some respects shows remarkable similarity to modern Mon culture.

Today, the Nyah Kur live in small villages distributed in a north-south strip that crosses Phetchabun, Nakhon Ratchasima and Chaiyaphum provinces, the majority living in Chaiyaphum. The Thai refer to them as ชาวบน meaning "upper people" or "sky people". Their self-designation is Nyah Kur, which in the Nyah Kur language means "mountain folk" and in modern Mon translates to "hill plantation people".

Language
The Nyah Kur language, as a direct descendant of Old Mon, is a sister language to the Mon language of Burma, the two of which constitute the only languages of the Monic branch of the Austroasiatic language family. A 2006 estimate places the number of speakers at approximately 1500 people with no monolinguals. The dialects spoken in Phetchabun and Nakhon Ratchasima have limited intelligibility with that of Chaiyaphum and are nearly extinct. Even in Chaiyaphum, the language is spoken mostly among older Nyah Kur, while others prefer to identify as Thai and speak either the local Isan language or the national Thai standard. Nyah Kur no longer has its own script and when written, employs the Thai alphabet is used. In 1984, a Nyah Kur-Thai-English dictionary was published.

Culture
In modern times, the Nyah Kur have had increasing contact with the surrounding Thai and Kuy population resulting modernization, migration and integration of cultures. Nyah Kur villages today are a mix of ethnic Nyah Kur and Thai-Lao families. The Nyah Kur were historically Animists but today most of them embraced Theravada Buddhism although traditional spirits, including Jao Paw Kun Dahn and Jao Paw Samian, are still worshiped. The Pah Re Re, a traditional courting celebration similar to that of the Mon, is still practiced, usually around the time of the Thai Songkran.

References

Ethnic groups in Thailand